Ciro Oreste Sirignano (born 1 October 1985) is an Italian football player. He plays as a defender for Lamezia Terme.

Club career
On 1 September 2020, he returned to Paganese.

On 1 September 2021, he moved to Lamezia Terme in Serie D.

References

External links

1985 births
Sportspeople from the Province of Naples
Living people
Italian footballers
Association football midfielders
S.S.C. Giugliano players
U.S. Avellino 1912 players
A.S. Sambenedettese players
Botev Plovdiv players
Cavese 1919 players
U.S. Catanzaro 1929 players
U.S. Gavorrano players
A.S. Martina Franca 1947 players
Paganese Calcio 1926 players
Santarcangelo Calcio players
F.C. Lamezia Terme players
Serie B players
Serie C players
Serie D players
First Professional Football League (Bulgaria) players
Italian expatriate footballers
Expatriate footballers in Bulgaria
Italian expatriate sportspeople in Bulgaria
S.S. Ischia Isolaverde players
Footballers from Campania